"I'm Missin' You" is a song recorded by the Canadian country music artist Shirley Myers. It was released in 2000 as the third single from her second studio album, There Will Come a Day. It peaked at number 10 on the RPM Country Tracks chart in June 2000.

Chart performance

References 

1999 songs
2000 singles
Shirley Myers songs
Song recordings produced by Keith Olsen
Songs written by Duane Steele
Songs written by Shirley Myers
Stony Plain Records singles